Falahari Baba, also known as Falahari Maharaj (born as Gautam Mishra), is a self-styled godman, who has been convicted for raping a 21 year-old woman and sentenced to life imprisonment. He is listed in the second list of "fake spiritual leaders" released by Akhil Bharatiya Akhara Parishad, the apex body of Hindu sadhus.

Life 
His full name is Swami Kaushlendra Prapannachari Falahari Maharaj. He studied up to class XII and also holds an ITI certificate course from Allahabad. He left his home and came to Alwar, Rajasthan in the 1990s. Falahari is married and has a daughter.

He dubbed "Falahari" (meaning fruit eater) because, he survived by only eating fruits, reportedly. He is reported to be 60 years old by The Times of India and 70 years old by The Free Press Journal, as of September 2017. He is associated with Ramanuja sampradaya.

He has been photographed with top political leaders and celebrities including prime minister Narendra Modi, home minister Rajnath Singh, the RSS chief Mohan Bhagwat, UP CM Yogi Adityanath and Rajasthan CM Vasundhara Raje Scindia.

He owns an Ashram in Alwar, called Venkatesh Divya Balaji Dham Ashram and also run Goshala in Alwar. In July, 2017, he had also attended to the Saint Sangam of BJP organized in Jaipur.

Rape case and conviction 
In September 2017, an FIR was lodged by the victim against Baba at Mahila police station of Bilaspur in Chhattisgarh. He was arrested on 23 September 2017, in Alwar. International Business Times reported, the victim said in the complaint that following the conviction of Gurmeet Ram Rahim Singh, she got courage and decided to report the matter to the police.

He was convicted and sentenced to life imprisonment by Additional District court of Alwar on 27 September 2018.

See also 
 Asaram
 Gurmeet Ram Rahim Singh

References

External links 
 Rape Accused Falahari Baba's Story (in Hindi)
 रेप के मामले में फंसे फलाहारी बाबा से पूछे गए 88 सवाल, बयान दर्ज (in Hindi, Aaj Tak)

21st-century criminals
21st-century religious leaders
Indian people convicted of rape
Members of the clergy convicted of rape
Living people
Indian rapists
Male actors from Rajasthan
Prisoners and detainees of India
Year of birth missing (living people)